is a Japanese anime television series created by studio TMS Entertainment, based on the CR Ginroku Gijinden Roman pachinko game, with original character designs by Lupin III creator Monkey Punch. In the fantasy historical story, the main character is a "helper" named Manjirou by day and a phantom thief "retriever" named Roman by night. Roman steals back people's precious items that were unfairly taken from them.

Plot 
The story takes place in Kyoto in the late 19th century. Manjiro has two faces—during the day, he works as a helper for people in Kyoto, but he also acts in secret to return people's property that has been stolen from corrupt men in power. As the retriever "Roman", Manjiro is getting involved in a nationwide conspiracy.

Characters

He is the main protagonist who goes by the name "Nezumi Kozo" at night, fighting against the injustices done to the townspeople. By day he is known as Mr. Helper, who does a myriad of odd jobs around town. He's not very good with money, since he will squander all his pay in gambling at the end of the day, which is why his sister Koharu doesn't trust him to run her decorative chopstick shop for fear that he may use the shop's earnings to finance his gambling habit.

She is Roman's younger sister, who runs a decorative chopstick shop by day. At night she assists with her brother's heroic capers together with their dog, Sakura.

Anime
The anime started airing on January 8, 2013. It is available subtitled in English on Crunchyroll.

Episode list

References

External links
 Official website 
 

2013 anime television series debuts
Action anime and manga
Comedy anime and manga
Historical anime and manga
TMS Entertainment
TV Tokyo original programming

ja:CR元禄義人伝浪漫#テレビアニメ